The Hugh Durham National Coach of the Year Award (formerly called the CollegeInsider.com Mid-Major Coach of the Year Award from 2005 to 2009) is an award given annually to the most outstanding mid-major men's college basketball head coach in NCAA Division I competition. The award was established in 2005 and was renamed for head coach Hugh Durham, who coached at Florida State, Georgia and Jacksonville. Among his many accomplishments, Durham is the only person to be the all-time winningest coach for three separate NCAA basketball programs.

Selection
The Hugh Durham Award is voted on by 20 members who are on a panel consisting of former and current head coaches. Durham himself is the chairman, and the award is presented at the Final Four to the top mid-major men's basketball coach.

Definitions of the term "mid-major" in the context of college basketball vary widely. For purposes of its "mid-major" awards and honors—the Durham Award for coaches and the Lou Henson Award and Lou Henson All-America Team for players—CollegeInsider.com has established its own definition of the term, which includes the following conferences, as well as any basketball independents.

 America East Conference
 Atlantic Sun Conference
 Big Sky Conference
 Big South Conference
 Big West Conference
 Colonial Athletic Association
 Horizon League
 Ivy League
 Metro Atlantic Athletic Conference
 Mid-American Conference
 Mid-Eastern Athletic Conference

 Missouri Valley Conference
 Northeast Conference
 Ohio Valley Conference
 Patriot League
 Southern Conference
 Southland Conference
 Southwestern Athletic Conference
 Summit League
 Sun Belt Conference
 West Coast Conference
 Western Athletic Conference

Of these conferences, the only ones that sponsor FBS football are the MAC and the Sun Belt. All other FBS conferences, as well as the Atlantic 10 Conference (which has not sponsored football at all since 2006), have been excluded from the Collegeinsider.com list of "mid-majors" throughout the award's history. Following major conference realignment that peaked in 2013, the WAC, which dropped football after the 2012 season, was added to the eligible list, while both offshoots of the original Big East Conference—the FBS American Athletic Conference and the new non-football Big East—were excluded from eligibility

Winners

Winners by school

References
General

Specific

External links
 

College basketball coach of the year awards in the United States
Awards established in 2005